John Howard (born 1939) was Prime Minister of Australia from 1996 to 2007.

John Howard may also refer to:

Other politicians
John Howard (died 1437) (1366–1437), MP for Essex, Cambridgeshire and Suffolk
John Howard (MP for Faversham) (1863–1911), British Member of Parliament for Faversham 1900–1906
John Howard (Southampton Test MP) (1913–1982), British Member of Parliament, 1955–1964
John Eager Howard (1752–1827), U.S. Senator from Maryland
John J. Howard (1869–1941), New York politician
John Morgan Howard (1837–1891), British judge and Conservative Party politician

Actors
John Howard (Australian actor) (born 1952), Australian actor
John Howard (American actor) (1913–1995), American actor

Sports
John Howard (cyclist) (born 1947), Olympic cyclist who set a land speed record on a pedal bicycle
John Howard (Canadian sprinter) (1888–1937), Canadian athlete who ran in the 1912 Summer Olympics
John Howard (fighter) (born 1983), mixed martial arts fighter
John Howard (lacrosse) (1934–2007), American educator and lacrosse player and coach
John Howard (Micronesian sprinter) (born 1981), Micronesian sprinter
John Howard (adventure racer), New Zealander considered the pioneer of adventure racing

John Obed Howard (1928–1975), Canadian lightweight boxer
Johnny Howard (born 1980), English rugby union player

Architects
John George Howard (1803–1890), born John Corby, Canadian architect
John Galen Howard (1864–1931), American architect in the early 20th century

Musicians
John Howard (singer-songwriter) (born 1953), English singer-songwriter and pianist
John Tasker Howard (1890–1964), American music historian and composer

Science and engineering
John Howard (civil engineer) (1901–1986), British civil engineer
John Howard (industrialist) (1791–1878), British industrialist
John Howard (mathematician) (1753–1799), Scottish mathematician
John Howard (NIOSH director), American public health administrator
John Howard (optical physicist) (1921–2015), president of the Optical Society of America in 1991
John Eliot Howard (1807–1883), English chemist

Military
John Howard (British Army officer) (1912–1999), best known for leading a vital assault during D-Day in the Second World War
John Howard, 1st Duke of Norfolk (c. 1425–1485), Duke of Norfolk and Lord High Admiral
John Howard, 15th Earl of Suffolk (1739–1820), British soldier and nobleman
John Martin Howard (1917–1942), United States Navy officer

Others
John Howard (author) (born 1961), English author
John Howard (prison reformer) (1726–1790), English prison reformer of the 18th century
John Howard Society of Canada
John Howard (UK businessman), British businessman
John Howard, a minor character in Marvel Comics
John C. Howard (1930–1983), American film editor
John D. Howard, American businessman and private equity investor, head of Irving Place Capital
John Curtois Howard, Chief Justice of Ceylon, 1939–1945
John Langley Howard (1902–1999), American artist, muralist, printmaker and illustrator
John P. Howard III, American lawyer and judge

See also
John Wagner (born 1949), comics writer who used the nom de plume John Howard
Jack Howard (disambiguation)
Jon Howard (born 1985), musician
Jonathan Howard (disambiguation)